54 (fifty-four) is the natural number following 53 and preceding 55.

In mathematics
 54 is an abundant number and a semiperfect number, like all other multiples of 6.
 It is twice the third power of three, 3 + 3 = 54, and hence is a Leyland number.

 54 can be written as the sum of three squares in three different ways:  =  =  = 54. It is the smallest number with this property. 
 It is a 19-gonal number,

In base 10, 54 is a Harshad number.

The Holt graph has 54 edges.

The sine of an angle of 54 degrees is half the golden ratio.

The number of primes <= 28.

A Lehmer-Comtet number.

In science
The atomic number of xenon is 54.

Astronomy

 Messier object M54, a magnitude 8.5 globular cluster in the constellation Sagittarius
 The New General Catalogue object NGC 54, a spiral galaxy in the constellation Cetus
 The number of years in three Saros cycles of eclipses of the sun and moon is known as a Triple Saros or exeligmos (Greek: "turn of the wheel").

In sports
 Fewest points in an NBA playoff game: Chicago (96), Utah (54), June 7, 1998
 The New York Rangers won the Stanley Cup in 1994, 54 years after their previous Cup win.  It is the longest drought in the trophy's history.
 For years car number 54 was driven by NASCAR's Lennie Pond. More recently, it is known as the Nationwide Series car number for Kyle Busch.
 A score of 54 on a par 72 course in golf is colloquially referred to as a perfect round. This score has never been achieved in competition.
 The number used when a player is defeated 3 games in a row in racquetball.

In other fields
54 is also:
+54 The code for international direct dial phone calls to Argentina
A broadcast television channel number
54, a 1998 film about Studio 54 starring Ryan Phillippe, Mike Myers, and Salma Hayek
54, a novel by the Wu Ming collective of authors
In the title of a 1960s television show Car 54, Where Are You?
The number of the French department Meurthe-et-Moselle
New York's Warwick New York Hotel is on West 54th Street
The number of cards in a deck of playing cards, if two jokers are included
The number of countries in Africa
Year identifier used on motor vehicles registered in the UK between 1 September 2004 and 28 February 2005
Six by nine, the incorrect Answer to the Ultimate Question of Life, the Universe, and Everything

See also 
 List of highways numbered 54

References 

Integers